Drimia pancration is a species of plants in the family Asparagaceae.

Sources

References 

Flora of Malta
Scilloideae